The UCT Mathematics Competition is an annual mathematics competition for schools in the Western Cape province of South Africa, held at the University of Cape Town.

Around 7000 participants from Grade 8 to Grade 12 take part, writing a multiple-choice paper. Individual and pair entries are accepted, but all write the same paper for their grade.
The current holder of the School Trophy is Rondebosch Boys High School, with Diocesan College achieving second place in the 2022 competition. These two schools have held the top positions in the competition for a number of years.

The competition was established in 1977 by Mona Leeuwenberg and Shirley Fitton, who were teachers at Diocesan College and Westerford High School, and since 1987 has been run by Professor John Webb of the University of Cape Town.

Awards

Mona Leeuwenburg Trophy
The Mona Leeuwenburg Trophy is awarded to the school with the best overall performance in the competition.

UCT Trophy
The UCT Trophy is awarded to the school with the best performance that has not participated in the competition more than twice before.

Diane Tucker Trophy
The Diane Tucker Trophy is awarded to the girl with the best performance in the competition. This trophy was first made in year 2000.

Moolla Trophy
The Moolla Trophy was donated to the competition by the Moolla family. Saadiq, Haroon and Ashraf Moolla represented Rondebosch Boys' High School and achieved Gold Awards from 2003 to 2011. The trophy is awarded to a school from a disadvantaged community that shows a notable performance in the competition.

Lesley Reeler Trophy
The Lesley Reeler Trophy is awarded for the best individual performance over five years (grades 8 to 12).

References

External links
 UCT Mathematics Competition

University of Cape Town
Mathematics competitions